This list contains an alphabetical listing of historically significant or leading case law in the area of patent law. For a list of patent law cases in just the United States, see United States patent law cases.

A 
 Aerotel v Telco and Macrossan's Application (UK, 2006)
 Anderson’s-Black Rock, Inc. v. Pavement Salvage Co. (US, 1969)
 Apple Inc. litigation (multiple, multinational cases)
 Apple v. HTC (US, 2010)
 Apple Inc. v. Samsung Electronics Co., Ltd. (multiple, multinational cases, ongoing)
 Ariad v. Lilly (US, 2006)
 Arizona Cartridge Remanufacturers Association Inc. v. Lexmark International Inc. (US, 2005)
 Association for Molecular Pathology v. Myriad Genetics (US, 2013)
 Atomic Energy Generation Device Case (JP, 1969) - relates to the concept of "incomplete invention"
 Auction Method/Hitachi (EPO, 2004)

 B 
 Bilski v. Kappos (US)
 Bowman v. Monsanto (US, 2012)
 Bauer & Cie. v. O'Donnell (US, 1913)

 C 
 Catnic Components Ltd. v. Hill & Smith Ltd. (UK, 1982)
 City of Elizabeth v. American Nicholson Pavement Co. (US, 1878)
 Continental Paper Bag Co. v. Eastern Paper Bag Co. (US, 1908)
 Creative Technology v. Apple (US and international, 2006)

 D 
 Diamond v. Chakrabarty (US, 1980)
 Diamond v. Diehr (US, 1981)

 E 
 EBay Inc. v. MercExchange, L.L.C. (US, 2006)
 Egbert v. Lippmann (US, 1881)
 Egyptian Goddess v. Swisa (US, 2008)
 Ex Parte Bowman (US, 2001)
 Ex Parte Lundgren (US, 2004)
 Ex Parte Quayle (US, 1935)

 F 
 Festo Corp. v. Shoketsu Kinzoku Kogyo Kabushiki Co. (US, 2002)
 Free World Trust v. Électro Santé Inc. (CA, 2000)

G

 Gottschalk v. Benson (US, 1972)
 Graham v. John Deere Co. (US, 1966)
 Graver Tank & Manufacturing Co. v. Linde Air Products Co. (US, 1950)

H
 Harvard College v. Canada (Commissioner of Patents): patent of higher lifeforms (CA, 2002)
 Honeywell v. Sperry Rand (US, 1973)
 Hotchkiss v. Greenwood (US, 1850)
 Huawei Technologies Co. Ltd v ZTE Corp. and ZTE Deutschland GmbH (European Court of Justice, C-170/13, 2015), judgement on standard-essential patents

 I 
 Illinois Tool Works Inc. v. Independent Ink, Inc. (US, 2006)

 Improver v Remington (UK, 1990)
 In re Bilski (US, 2008)
 In re Seagate Technology (US, 2007)

J

K
 Kirin-Amgen v Hoechst Marion Roussel (UK, 2004)
 Kodak v. Apple (US, 2010, ongoing)
 KSR v. Teleflex (US, 2007)

LLear, Inc. v. Adkins (US, 1969)

M
 Markman v. Westview Instruments, Inc. (US, 1996)
 Mayo v. Prometheus (US, 2011)
 MedImmune, Inc. v. Genentech, Inc. (US, 2007)
 Menashe v. William Hill (UK, 2002)
 Merck v. Integra (US, 2005)
 Monsanto Canada Inc. v. Schmeiser (CA, 2004)
 Motorola Mobility v. Apple Inc. (US, 2010)

N
 Nokia v. Apple (US & international, 2009)

 O Orange-Book-Standard (DE, 2009), on the interaction between patent law and standards

 P 
 Parker v. Flook (US, 1978)
 Pension Benefit Systems Partnership (EPO, 2000)
 Pfaff v. Wells Electronics, Inc. (US, 1998)

Q
 Quanta v. LG Electronics (US, 2008)

 R 

 S 
 State Street Bank v. Signature Financial Group (US, 1998)

T
 Typhoon Touch v. Dell (US, 2008)

U
 United States v. Adams (US, 1966)

V

W
 Warner-Jenkinson Company, Inc. v. Hilton Davis Chemical Co.'' (US, 1997)

X

Y

Z

See also 
 List of decisions and opinions of the Enlarged Board of Appeal of the European Patent Office
 List of decisions of the EPO Boards of Appeal relating to Article 52(2) and (3) EPC
 List of UK judgments relating to excluded subject matter
 List of United States patent law cases
 List of trademark case law
 List of copyright case law

External links
"Internet Sources for Intellectual Property Case Law" on the WIPO web site
IP Precedents Database at the Research Center for the Legal System of Intellectual Property, Waseda University

Patent

Case law
Intellectual property law